The Gettysburg Review is a quarterly literary magazine featuring short stories, poetry, essays and reviews. Work appearing in the magazine often is reprinted in "best-of" anthologies and receives awards.

The little magazine "is recognized as one of the country’s premier journals," according to a description at the Web site of the New York Public Library. The 2007 U.S. News guide to the best colleges described the review as "recognized as one of the country's best literary journals." According to a Web page of the English Department of the University of Wisconsin Colleges, the Gettysburg Review is considered a "major literary journal in the U.S."

Founded in 1988, the magazine is published by Gettysburg College in Gettysburg, Pennsylvania. Its quarterly issues come out in January, April, July, and October.

The magazine does not print material which has been published elsewhere. Along with fresh and new short stories, it is open to publishing original poetry, whether short or long,  and excerpts from novels. The magazine will occasionally serialize longer fictional works over more than one issue. "Essays can be on virtually any subject, so long as it is treated in a literary fashion — gracefully and in depth," according to the magazine's Web site.

The Gettysburg Review is one of the most frequent sources of material for The Best American Essays, The Best American Poetry, and The Best American Short Stories series. Other anthologies that have reprinted work originally published in the magazine: The Pushcart Prize: Best of the Small Presses, The Best Creative Nonfiction, The Best American Mystery Stories, Best New American Voices, Best New Poets, New Stories from the South, and Prize Stories: The O. Henry Awards. Other work has been reprinted in publications such as Harpers and the UTNE Reader.

Prominent writers who have appeared in the magazine's pages include E. L. Doctorow, Rita Dove, Joyce Carol Oates, Jeffrey Eugenides, Linda Pastan, James Tate, and Donald Hall. Recent writers published in the journal include Gary Fincke, Robert Gibb and Jacob M. Appel.

The periodical has won awards including the Best New Journal award, four Best Journal Design awards from the Council of Editors of Learned Journals, and a PEN/Nora Magid Award for Excellence in Editing.

In a 1994 review of the magazine, Ron Tanner wrote that the stories in the 1993 issues were widely varied in style, but "are clearly in the mainstream of contemporary American fiction — you will not find 'experimental' work in The Gettysburg Review."

He also found the stories have a common "concern for character, and an examination of the emotional and psychological distance one might travel when faced with a problem.  [...] each compels the character to make a decision, to make an effort, to make a move. Consequently, things happen in these stories. Which is to say that we end in a place very different from the story's beginning. In no resolution of a Gettysburg story, however, do we find ourselves living Happily Ever After. Life is more complicated than that, these writers assert."

The quarterly gets about 6,000 submissions per year and does not solicit work except for occasional reviews. "[W]e work hard not to have a regular stable of writers or favored persons of any kind," according to founding editor Peter Stitt. "We are most proud of publishing writers who have never before appeared in a nationally-circulated journal. But we do not actively search through the slush pile for anything but good writing."

The magazine is supported financially by Gettysburg College, for the most part, although it also receives grants from the Pennsylvania Council on the Arts and the NEA, along with some revenue from subscriptions.

Appearances in The Best American Mystery Stories series
 The Best American Mystery Stories 2008, Joyce Carol Oates, "Doll: A Romance of the Mississippi"
 The Best American Mystery Stories 2008, Kyle Minor, "A Day Meant to Do Less"  
 The Best American Mystery Stories 2006, Emily Raboteau, "Smile" 
 The Best American Mystery Stories 2004, Christopher Coake, "All Through the House"

Appearances in The Best American Poetry series

 The Best American Poetry 2009
 The Best American Poetry 2006  
 The Best American Poetry 2000 
 The Best American Poetry 1999  
 The Best American Poetry 1998 
 The Best American Poetry 1997
 The Best American Poetry 1995
 The Best American Poetry 1994  
 The Best American Poetry 1993
 The Best American Poetry 1990 
 The Best American Poetry 1989

Masthead

The magazine's masthead, as of December 2014:

 Editor: Mark Drew
 Managing Editor: Jess L. Bryant
 Marketing & Circulation Manager: Kris Koontz
 Current Intern: Carley Grow

Advisory and Contributing Editors:

 Lee K. Abbott
 Rita Dove 
 Donald Hall
 Rebecca McClanahan
 Richard Wilbur
 Paul Zimmer 

Advisory Board:

 Fritz Gaenslen
 Fred Leebron 
 Kathryn Rhett
 Jack Ryan

See also 
List of literary magazines

Notes

External links
The Gettysburg Review Web site

Poetry magazines published in the United States
Quarterly magazines published in the United States
Fiction magazines
Gettysburg College
Magazines established in 1988
Magazines published in Pennsylvania